The Emily Morgan Hotel, formerly known as the Medical Arts Building, is a 13-story Neo-Gothic hotel near the Alamo and part of the Alamo Plaza Historic District in San Antonio, Texas. It is known for being one of the most haunted locations in San Antonio.

History
The builting was originaly built and designed by architect Ralph Cameron in 1924 as the Medical Arts Building. It housed doctors' offices and a 50-bed hospital. 
After a succession of owners and the move of the medical facilities elsewhere, it was converted to office space in 1976.  In 1984 the building was remodeled and renamed to the Emily Morgan Hotel. The conversion gutted and completely rebuilt the interior of the structure, but kept the exterior elements intact. In 2012 the building went under a multi-million dollar renovation and was bought by the DoubleTree brand of Hilton.  It is recognized as a "Historic Hotel of America" by the National Trust for Historic Preservation.

Hauntings
It is said that the 600 men who died in the Battle of the Alamo possibly haunt the building. It is also believed that during its time as a hospital, doctors housed people with psychological conditions.

Employees at the hotel have reported seeing doors close for no reason, phones ringing with nobody on the other line, and feeling a presence when no ones around. Other hauntings include seeing a woman in white, hospital carts outside a hotel room and "orbs" caught on camera.

References
  

 
Buildings and structures in San Antonio
Historic Hotels of America
Hotels in Texas